"Turn Back Time" is a song by Danish dance-pop group Aqua, released as their seventh single overall, and the sixth from their debut album, Aquarium (1997). The song was also included on the soundtrack for the 1998 film Sliding Doors, starring Gwyneth Paltrow, and was released across the world throughout 1998, starting with the United States in January. Sampling the Pet Shop Boys' 1988 single "Heart", the track possesses less of a bubble pop sound than Aqua's other releases; it is slow-paced and shows the full range of Lene Nystrøm's vocals but maintains the Aqua sound. In Japan, "Turn Back Time" was released along with "My Oh My".

Critical reception
Larry Flick from Billboard concluded that "here's what will likely be the third successful single from the Euro-dance act's massive album, "Aquarium"." He added, "It is, by far, the most credible pop offering from the set, with its shuffling faux-funk beat and sax lines. Everything about this track is surprisingly reserved-including the lead vocals, which are dramatically toned down from a kewpie-doll squeak to a quasi-soulful belt." An editor from Daily Record wrote, "At first I couldn't believe this was Aqua - a mature, soul-searching ballad from the makers of Barbie Girl and Doctor Jones. No plastic pop and twee lyrics. They can pluck guitars and the singer has a beautiful voice". 

Dayton Daily Newss reviewer noted the "mellow, trip-hoppy beats" of the song. Sarah Davis from Dotmusic said that the singer's tones on the song "bear an uncanny resemblance" to the "Material Girl" by Madonna. She added that the ballad is "relying less on Euro-pop cliches than their previous two singles, it shows that Aqua can write songs which move beyond the cartoon world of their stylists." Dave Sholin from the Gavin Report felt that it "[was] time to take it downtempo, and this standout track from Aquarium contains all the elements necessary to quickly float to the top. More than a handful of PDs and MDs consider this ballad to have Number One potential. This is an impressive display of the Danish group's versatility."

Chart performance
"Turn Back Time" was successful on the charts on several continents, although it didn't reach the same level of success as "Barbie Girl" and "Doctor Jones". However, in Europe, it peaked at number-one in both Scotland and the United Kingdom. In the latter, the single, as their third number-one single, went straight to the top in its first week at the UK Singles Chart, on May 10, 1998. In Hungary, it reached number two, being held off the top spot by Ákos's "Ikon". "Turn Back Time" made it to the top 10 also in Ireland and Sweden, and was a top 20 hit in Austria, Belgium, Italy and the Netherlands, as well as on the Eurochart Hot 100, where it hit number 12 in May 1998. Outside Europe, it peaked at number two in New Zealand, number ten in Australia, number 14 on the RPM Top Singles chart in Canada and number 18 on the US Billboard Mainstream Top 40 chart. Therefore, it was their second highest-charting hit in the US. The single earned a gold record in Australia, New Zealand and Sweden, and a silver record in the UK.

Retrospective response
Can't Stop the Pop declared it to be "their finest song by a country mile – and one of the best pop ballads of the ‘90s to boot." They also added it as "one of the biggest surprises of the ‘90s." Alex Young from Consequence of Sound said that the "slower paced song allows Lene's vocal range to shine." Tom Ewing of Freaky Trigger described it as a "cryptic, self-hating ballad about choices and dire consequences." He noted that Nystrøm "has a strong, torchy voice" and "can set a mood." He also added that "in half a verse she's established a lonely, withdrawn, guilty feeling she might push against in the rest of the song." Bob Waliszewski of Plugged In opined that it deal with "regrets over unfaithfulness with a desire for reconciliation". Pop Rescue said "Turn Back Time" is the best song of their career, adding that "here, Lene shows off her vocal range beautifully, and it's great to hear her pitched against the soft beats, piano, and gentle synths without some randomly thrown in 'eye-pee-eye-ohs. Perfect." Dave Fawbert from ShortList described it as "one of the all-time great lost pop classics. No ifs, no buts, no irony, just a glorious, timeless piece of songwriting."

Music video
The accompanying music video for "Turn Back Time" contained footage from Sliding Doors, and was therefore a departure from the campy and humorous style by the group. There are two different edits of this video, one contains more clips from the film. In the video, the doppelgänger of the lead singer Lene Nystrøm is chasing her in the London Underground. Much of the video was filmed on the abandoned platform 5 at Holborn tube station.

Track listings

 Scandinavian and European CD single, UK cassette single "Turn Back Time" (original version) – 4:10
 "Turn Back Time" (Love to Infinity's classic radio mix) – 3:17

 Scandinavian maxi-CD single "Turn Back Time" (original version) – 4:08
 "Turn Back Time" (Love to Infinity's classic radio mix) – 3:17
 "Turn Back Time" (Love to Infinity's classic Paradise mix) – 7:25

 UK CD1 "Turn Back Time" (original version) – 4:08
 "Turn Back Time" (Love to Infinity's classic radio mix) – 3:20
 "Turn Back Time" (Metro Scuba club mix) – 6:34
 "Turn Back Time" (Master mix) – 5:13
 "Turn Back Time" (Thunderball mix) – 6:59

 UK CD2 "Turn Back Time" (original version) – 4:08
 "Turn Back Time" (Metro radio edit) – 3:22
 "Turn Back Time" (Love to Infinity's classic Paradise mix) – 7:29
 "Turn Back Time" (CD-ROM video)

 UK 12-inch singleA1. "Turn Back Time" (album version)
A2. "Turn Back Time" (Love to Infinity's classic Paradise mix)
B1. "Turn Back Time" (Thunderball mix)
B2. "Turn Back Time" (Master mix)

 Australian CD single "Turn Back Time" (album version) – 4:09
 "Turn Back Time" (Love to Infinity's classic radio mix) – 3:20
 "Turn Back Time" (Love to Infinity's classic Paradise mix) – 7:25
 "Turn Back Time" (Metro Scuba club mix) – 6:34

 Japanese CD single'
 "Turn Back Time" (original version)
 "Turn Back Time" (Love to Infinity's classic radio mix)
 "My Oh My" (radio edit)
 "My Oh My" (Spike, Clyde'N'Eightball club mix)

Charts

Weekly charts

Year-end charts

Certifications

References

Aqua (band) songs
1990s ballads
1998 singles
Number-one singles in Scotland
Pop ballads
Songs written by Claus Norreen
Songs written by Søren Rasted
UK Singles Chart number-one singles